The Coney Island History Project, or CIHP, founded in 2004, is a not-for-profit organization that works to record and increase awareness of Coney Island's history.

Oral history project 
The Coney Island History Project was founded in 2004 by Carol Hill Albert and Jerome Albert in honor of Dewey Albert, creator of Astroland. Since its inception, Carol Hill and Jerome Albert tapped local historian Charles Denson as director of the Coney Island History Project. The project began as an oral history project, collecting stories of Coney Island from longtime local residents. The Coney Island History Project records, archives, and shares oral history interviews about Coney Island. The CIHP conducts interviews in English, Russian, Chinese, and Spanish. During the COVID-19 pandemic, the CIHP continued to record interviews via phone or Skype.

Over 370 interviews are available online via The Coney Island History Project Oral History Archive.

Exhibitions 
The History Project’s exhibition center is located next to Deno's Wonder Wheel Amusement Park. The center occupies a former arcade booth, presenting educational exhibitions, events, and performances; displaying historic artifacts and documentary material from Coney Island's history. The collection holds many artifacts of Coney Island, including an authentic Steeplechase horse, part of Steeplechase Park.

In 2014, the history project presented an exhibition on the history of the Steeplechase Face.

In 2018, the Coney Island History Project presented an exhibition examining the history of Coney Island Creek. After the exhibit, the History Project has presented mobile exhibitions on the Coney Island Creek including one at City of Water Day on the Coney Island Creek in Kaiser Park, co-hosted with the Coney Island Beautification Project and the Waterfront Alliance.

Guided tours 
The Coney Island History Project offers guided tours of Coney Island. In 2019, the CIHP offered an immigrant Heritage Tour of Coney Island in English and Mandarin. The special walking tour was offered free of charge as part of Immigrant Heritage Week 2019.

References

External links 

 CONEYOLOGIST - youtube channel presented by the CIHP
 Coney Island History Project - Oral History Archive

Coney Island
Historians of New York City
Historical society museums in New York City
History of New York City
Online archives of the United States
Oral historians
Oral history
Amusement museums in the United States
2004 establishments in New York City